Charles Jackson (31 May 1775 – 13 December 1855) was an American jurist.

Biography
He was born in Newburyport, Massachusetts. Jackson was the son of Newburyport merchant and Continental Congress Massachusetts delegate Jonathan Jackson and Hannah Tracy.

He graduated from Harvard University in 1793, studied law with Chief Justice Parsons, and began to practice in 1796 at Newburyport. In 1803, he relocated to Boston, where, associated with Judge Hubbard, he had a most lucrative practice, probably more lucrative than any other in New England had been up until that time.

Jackson was judge of the Massachusetts Supreme Court (1813–24), a member of the State Constitutional Convention of 1820, and one of the commissioners to revise the Massachusetts State Laws in 1833, drawing up the second part of the “Revised Statutes.” He also wrote Treatise on the Pleadings and Practice in Real Actions in 1828. Jackson was elected a Fellow of the American Academy of Arts and Sciences in 1817.

Family
He was the brother of Lowell, Massachusetts industrialist Patrick Tracy Jackson and Massachusetts General Hospital proponent James Jackson. His daughter, Amelia Lee Jackson, married physician Oliver Wendell Holmes, Sr., later becoming mother of Associate Justice of the Supreme Court of the United States Oliver Wendell Holmes, Jr.

Notes

References

External links
The Oliver Wendell Holmes Library at the Library of Congress contains the books of Holmes' great-grandfather, Judge Charles Jackson.

1775 births
1855 deaths
Fellows of the American Academy of Arts and Sciences
Harvard University alumni
Lawyers from Boston
Massachusetts state court judges
People from Newburyport, Massachusetts
People of colonial Massachusetts
19th-century American lawyers